Boris Mikhaylovich Gurevich (also Gurevitch, Gurewitsch, or Hurevych; 23 February 1937 – 12 November 2020) was a Soviet wrestler.

The figure of Boris Gurevich served as a model for the allegorical sculpture of the Soviet sculptor Yevgeny Vuchetich "Let's Forge Swords into Plowshares", installed in 1957 in New York near the UN building.

Gurevich, who was Jewish, was born in Kiev, Ukraine.

Career
Gurevich won the 1968 Summer Olympic Games freestyle middleweight (191.5 lbs; 82 kilograms) gold medal in Mexico City. He finished ahead of silver medalist Jigjidiin Mönkhbat of Mongolia and bronze medalist Prodan Gardzhev of Bulgaria.

He won a silver medal at the 1961 World Wrestling Championships at 87 kilograms, a gold medal at the 1967 World Wrestling Championships at 87 kilograms, and a gold medal at the 1969 World Wrestling Championships at 90 kilograms. He won a gold medal at the 1967 European Wrestling Championships at 87 kilograms, and a gold medal at the 1970 European Wrestling Championships at 90 kilograms.

He was inducted into the International Jewish Sports Hall of Fame in 1982.

See also
 List of select Jewish wrestlers

References

External links
 
 
 

1937 births
2020 deaths
Olympic wrestlers of the Soviet Union
Wrestlers at the 1968 Summer Olympics
Soviet male sport wrestlers
Olympic gold medalists for the Soviet Union
Olympic medalists in wrestling
Ukrainian male sport wrestlers
Jewish wrestlers
Soviet Jews
Jewish Ukrainian sportspeople
Sportspeople from Kyiv
Medalists at the 1968 Summer Olympics
Honoured Masters of Sport of the USSR
International Jewish Sports Hall of Fame inductees
National University of Ukraine on Physical Education and Sport alumni